The Fișag (also: Bancu, Valea Satului) is a left tributary of the river Olt in Romania. It discharges into the Olt near Cetățuia.

References

Rivers of Romania
Rivers of Harghita County